Helen Dora Lempriere (12 December 1907 – 5 November 1991) was an Australian painter, sculptor and printmaker.

Biography
Born in the Melbourne suburb of Malvern on 12 December 1907, she was the only child of Charles Algernon Lempriere (brother of businessman Geoffrey Lemprière) and Dora Elizabeth Octavia, née Mitchell (daughter of builder David Mitchell and younger sister of singer Nellie Melba).

She was educated at Toorak Ladies' College (1925) and then received tuition in art first from A. D. Colquhoun and later from Justus Jorgensen.

Conception totenism, a 1956 painting employing Aboriginal themes, is held in the Art Gallery of New South Wales. Other similar paintings and also prints donated by her husband after her death are in the collection of National Gallery of Australia and in the Grainger Museum at the University of Melbourne.

See also
Helen Lempriere National Sculpture Award

References

External links 

 1965 interview with Hazel de Berg
 1929 portrait by A. D. Colquhoun in Table Talk
 Photograph of Helen Lempriere

1907 births
1991 deaths
20th-century Australian women artists
Australian printmakers
Australian sculptors
Australian women painters
People from Malvern, Victoria
Artists from Melbourne
Australian people of Scottish descent
Australian people of Jersey descent